Silvi may refer to:

People

Surname
 Lilia Silvi (1922–2013), Italian film actress
 Maurizio Silvi, Italian make-up artist

Given name
 Silvi Antarini (born 1984), Indonesian badminton player
 Silvi Jan (born 1973), Israeli football player
 Silvi Vrait (1951–2013), Estonian singer and music teacher

Places
 Silvi, Abruzzo, Italy